Robert Freedman may refer to:
Robert Freedman (political scientist)
Robert L. Freedman, American screenwriter, playwright, and lyricist
Robert Freedman (tennis)

See also
Robert Freeman (disambiguation)